Martha MacDonald may refer to:

 Martha MacDonald, Canadian feminist economist
 Martha MacDonald, a fictional character in the British television drama series Monarch of the Glen